The Penn State Nittany Lions men's lacrosse team represents Pennsylvania State University in National Collegiate Athletic Association (NCAA) Division I college lacrosse.

History
Penn State was an independent varsity lacrosse program from 1913 through 1999 until it joined the Eastern College Athletic Conference (ECAC) from 2000-2009.  Penn State was a member of the Colonial Athletic Association (CAA) Conference from 2010 -2014. Penn State joined the newly formed lacrosse Big Ten Conference (B1G) starting in 2015 until today.

The current head coach is Jeff Tambroni since 2011, who was hired after a successful ten-year run as head coach at Cornell, including making it to two championship weekends with a close loss in the 2009 NCAA finals. He is among the winningest Division I lacrosse coaches with 200 career wins, was 2009 USILA Division I Coach of the Year, and three-time conference Coach of the Year with Penn State.  He played collegiate lacrosse at Hobart, where he ranks among the school's all-time greats after he earned three All-America awards and three national championships resulting in induction into their Hall of Fame.

Penn State has made five appearances in the NCAA Division I Men's Lacrosse Championship Tournament with a record of 2-5. The first appearance coming in 2003 resulted in a first-round loss to Towson 11-6. In 2005, they lost to Maryland in the first round 14-10.  The Nittany Lions made the tournament in 2013 as the #8 seed, the first time they achieved a seeding in the NCAAs, losing to Yale 13–10.  Penn State appeared in 2017 as the #7 seed but was eliminated in the first round by Towson 10-8.  2019 was their best season, the Nittany Lions were Big Ten Conference season and tournament champions for the first time and entered the 2019 tournament as the #1 seed. They had victories over UMBC 25-10 and Loyola 21-14 to advance to Championship weekend before their season came to an end with a 21-17 loss to Yale in the semifinals.

They have had 140 All-Americans and 12 Scholar All-Americans. There are two Nittany Lions in the National Lacrosse Hall of Fame, Glenn "Nick" Thiel, who was instrumental in making lacrosse at Penn State a viable sport, and Tom Hayes, an All-American player and later long time coach at Drexel and Rutgers.  National Football League wide receiver Chris Hogan was a standout lacrosse player for Penn State from 2008 to 2010.  Drew Adams '09, Hogan '10, Austin Kaut '13, Chris Sabia '19, Grant Ament '20, Gerard Arceri '21, and Mac O'Keefe '21 are Penn State lacrosse alumni playing professional lacrosse in the Premier Lacrosse League.  In 2013, Kaut was named the first Penn State NCAA Division I goaltender of the year.  Ament had a record-breaking year in 2019 when he was the first Nittany Lion awarded the NCAA Division I Outstanding Attackman of the Year, voted Big Ten Offensive Player of the Year, and became the Division I NCAA lacrosse record holder for most assists (96) and assist per game (5.65) for a season, and most points (tied 25) and assists (18) in the Championship Tournament.  He also holds the records for most points (126) in a Big Ten season, and career points and assists in the Big Ten (284 and 191).  O'Keefe holds the records for most career goals (221 through 66 games) in the history of Division I NCAA lacrosse, most goals in a Big Ten season (78 in 2019), and most goals in a Championship Tournament game (tied 9 vs Loyola in 2019)

Penn State has played Rutgers more than any other school and is 22-46 against them as of 2021.  Since 1998, Penn State and Rutgers have played annually for the Friendship Cup. Penn State has won the Friendship cup 13 times and Rutgers has won it 8 times as of 2021.

When Michigan began Division I lacrosse play in 2012, the only Big Ten schools at the time (Penn State, Michigan and Ohio State) began playing annually for the Creator’s Trophy. The tradition continues today among the three original members. Penn State claimed the Creator's Trophy in 2012, 2014, 2016, 2017, 2018 (3 way tie), 2019, and 2021. (2020 - no Creator's Trophy games due to Covid).

Season Results
The following is a list of Penn State's results by season as an NCAA Division I program:

{| class="wikitable"

†NCAA canceled 2020 collegiate activities due to the COVID-19 virus.

Alumni in the Premier Lacrosse League (4)

See also
Drew Adams
Chris Garrity
Pat Heim
Chris Hogan
Lacrosse in Pennsylvania
 NCAA Men's Lacrosse Championship
 NCAA Division I men's lacrosse records
United States Intercollegiate Lacrosse Association

References

External links
 
 Men's Lacrosse at BigTen.org
 NCAA men's lacrosse webpage

NCAA Division I men's lacrosse teams
Penn State Nittany Lions men's lacrosse
1921 establishments in Pennsylvania
Lacrosse clubs established in 1921